Termioptycha margarita is a moth in the family Pyralidae. It is found in Japan, Taiwan, and probably in Sri Lanka.

References

Pyralidae